Rutland is a neighbourhood of the City of Kelowna in the Okanagan region of the Southern Interior of British Columbia, Canada, located on the northeast edge of the city's core. Nearby neighbourhoods include Dilworth, Belgo, Black Mountain, Toovey Heights, Hall Road, Ellison, Central City, and Southeast Kelowna. It is a member of the Osoyoos Division Yale Land District.

Rutland is Kelowna's largest neighbourhood by far. Rutland has a population of 34, 800 and the median age is 39.2. The neighbourhood is mostly residential, but also has a thriving business community and Kelowna City council is working with community groups to make plans for revitalisation of Rutland Town Centre.

History 
Rutland was an unincorporated town until it was merged with the nearby city of Kelowna in 1973 by an act of the provincial legislature.

Rutland is named for an early settler, John "Hope" Matthew Rutland. Rutland, who had previously lived at Australian, near Quesnel, farmed wheat, planted the first commercial orchards, and installed the first large irrigation system in the area. In the 1900s he sold his land to a syndicate which subdivided the land and adjacent land and named the district after him. The post office was opened on October 1, 1908.

References

External links 

 Rutland Residents Association

Neighbourhoods in Kelowna
Articles containing video clips